Cooks Mills may refer to:

Cooks Mills, Illinois, United States
Cooks Mills, New Jersey, United States
Cooks Mills, Welland, Ontario, Canada
Cooks Mills, Nipissing District, Ontario, Canada
Spragge, Ontario, Canada, formerly known as Cook's Mills
Battle of Cook's Mills, a battle in Ontario, Canada between American and British forces during the War of 1812.